This is a list of Regional District Electoral Areas in the province of British Columbia, Canada, sorted by regional district. These are unincorporated areas outside of municipal boundaries.

Alberni-Clayoquot Regional District
Alberni-Clayoquot A, British Columbia
Alberni-Clayoquot B, British Columbia
Alberni-Clayoquot C, British Columbia
Alberni-Clayoquot D, British Columbia
Alberni-Clayoquot E, British Columbia
Alberni-Clayoquot F, British Columbia

Regional District of Bulkley-Nechako
Bulkley-Nechako A, British Columbia
Bulkley-Nechako B, British Columbia
Bulkley-Nechako C, British Columbia
Bulkley-Nechako D, British Columbia
Bulkley-Nechako E, British Columbia
Bulkley-Nechako F, British Columbia
Bulkley-Nechako G, British Columbia

Capital Regional District
Juan de Fuca Electoral Area
Saltspring Island Electoral Area
Southern Gulf Islands Electoral Area

Cariboo Regional District
Cariboo A, British Columbia
Cariboo B, British Columbia
Cariboo C, British Columbia
Cariboo D, British Columbia
Cariboo E, British Columbia
Cariboo F, British Columbia
Cariboo G, British Columbia
Cariboo H, British Columbia
Cariboo I, British Columbia
Cariboo J, British Columbia
Cariboo K, British Columbia
Cariboo L, British Columbia

Central Coast Regional District
Central Coast A, British Columbia
Central Coast B, British Columbia
Central Coast C, British Columbia
Central Coast D, British Columbia
Central Coast E, British Columbia

Regional District of Central Kootenay
Central Kootenay A, British Columbia
Central Kootenay B, British Columbia
Central Kootenay C, British Columbia
Central Kootenay D, British Columbia
Central Kootenay E, British Columbia
Central Kootenay F, British Columbia
Central Kootenay G, British Columbia
Central Kootenay H, British Columbia
Central Kootenay I, British Columbia
Central Kootenay J, British Columbia
Central Kootenay K, British Columbia

Regional District of Central Okanagan
West Central Okanagan Electoral Area, British Columbia
East Central Okanagan Electoral Area, British Columbia

Columbia-Shuswap Regional District
Columbia-Shuswap A, British Columbia
Columbia-Shuswap B, British Columbia
Columbia-Shuswap C, British Columbia
Columbia-Shuswap D, British Columbia
Columbia-Shuswap E, British Columbia
Columbia-Shuswap F, British Columbia
Columbia-Shuswap G, British Columbia

Comox Valley Regional District
Comox Valley A, British Columbia
Comox Valley B, British Columbia
Comox Valley C, British Columbia

Cowichan Valley Regional District
Cowichan Valley A, British Columbia
Cowichan Valley B, British Columbia
Cowichan Valley C, British Columbia
Cowichan Valley D, British Columbia
Cowichan Valley E, British Columbia
Cowichan Valley F, British Columbia
Cowichan Valley G, British Columbia
Cowichan Valley H, British Columbia
Cowichan Valley I, British Columbia

Regional District of East Kootenay
East Kootenay A, British Columbia
East Kootenay B, British Columbia
East Kootenay C, British Columbia
East Kootenay E, British Columbia
East Kootenay F, British Columbia
East Kootenay G, British Columbia

Fraser Valley Regional District
Fraser Valley A, British Columbia
Fraser Valley B, British Columbia
Fraser Valley C, British Columbia
Fraser Valley D, British Columbia
Fraser Valley E, British Columbia
Fraser Valley F, British Columbia
Fraser Valley G, British Columbia
Fraser Valley H, British Columbia

Regional District of Fraser-Fort George
Fraser-Fort George A, British Columbia
Fraser-Fort George C, British Columbia
Fraser-Fort George D, British Columbia
Fraser-Fort George E, British Columbia
Fraser-Fort George F, British Columbia
Fraser-Fort George G, British Columbia
Fraser-Fort George H, British Columbia

Regional District of Kitimat-Stikine
Kitimat-Stikine A, British Columbia
Kitimat-Stikine B, British Columbia
Kitimat-Stikine C (Part 1), British Columbia
Kitimat-Stikine C (Part 2), British Columbia
Kitimat-Stikine D, British Columbia
Kitimat-Stikine E, British Columbia

Regional District of Kootenay Boundary
Kootenay Boundary A, British Columbia
Kootenay Boundary B, British Columbia
Kootenay Boundary C, British Columbia
Kootenay Boundary D, British Columbia
Kootenay Boundary E, British Columbia

Metro Vancouver Regional District
Metro Vancouver A, British Columbia

Regional District of Mount Waddington
Mount Waddington A, British Columbia
Mount Waddington B, British Columbia
Mount Waddington C, British Columbia
Mount Waddington D, British Columbia

Regional District of Nanaimo
Nanaimo A, British Columbia
Nanaimo B, British Columbia
Nanaimo C, British Columbia
Nanaimo E, British Columbia
Nanaimo F, British Columbia
Nanaimo G, British Columbia
Nanaimo H, British Columbia

North Coast Regional District
North Coast A, British Columbia
North Coast C, British Columbia
North Coast D, British Columbia
North Coast E, British Columbia

Regional District of North Okanagan
North Okanagan B, British Columbia
North Okanagan C, British Columbia
North Okanagan D, British Columbia
North Okanagan E, British Columbia
North Okanagan F, British Columbia

Northern Rockies Regional Municipality
None (region is unitary)

Regional District of Okanagan-Similkameen
Okanagan-Similkameen A, British Columbia
Okanagan-Similkameen B, British Columbia
Okanagan-Similkameen C, British Columbia
Okanagan-Similkameen D, British Columbia
Okanagan-Similkameen E, British Columbia
Okanagan-Similkameen F, British Columbia
Okanagan-Similkameen G, British Columbia
Okanagan-Similkameen H, British Columbia
Okanagan-Similkameen I, British Columbia

Peace River Regional District
Peace River B, British Columbia
Peace River C, British Columbia
Peace River D, British Columbia
Peace River E, British Columbia

qathet Regional District
qathet A, British Columbia
qathet B, British Columbia
qathet C, British Columbia
qathet D, British Columbia
qathet E, British Columbia

Squamish-Lillooet Regional District
Squamish-Lillooet A, British Columbia
Squamish-Lillooet B, British Columbia
Squamish-Lillooet C, British Columbia
Squamish-Lillooet D, British Columbia

Stikine Region
Stikine Region, British Columbia (regional district electoral area)

Strathcona Regional District
Strathcona A, British Columbia
Strathcona B, British Columbia
Strathcona C, British Columbia
Strathcona D, British Columbia

Sunshine Coast Regional District
Sunshine Coast A, British Columbia
Sunshine Coast B, British Columbia
Sunshine Coast D, British Columbia
Sunshine Coast E, British Columbia
Sunshine Coast F, British Columbia

Thompson-Nicola Regional District
Thompson-Nicola A, British Columbia
Thompson-Nicola B, British Columbia
Thompson-Nicola E, British Columbia
Thompson-Nicola I, British Columbia
Thompson-Nicola J, British Columbia
Thompson-Nicola L, British Columbia
Thompson-Nicola M, British Columbia
Thompson-Nicola N, British Columbia
Thompson-Nicola O, British Columbia
Thompson-Nicola P, British Columbia

 elec